The Burford class were three 68-gun third-rate ships of the line designed for the Royal Navy by Sir Joseph Allin. The Burford ships were almost the last "70-gun" (in practice 68-gun) ships designed by Allin. They were built to the draught specified by the 1745 Establishment as amended in 1754.

Ships
 
Builder: Chatham Dockyard
Ordered: 15 January 1754
Laid down: 30 October 1754
Launched: 5 May 1757 
Fate: Sold to be broken up, 1785 

 
Builder: Portsmouth Dockyard 
Ordered: 15 January 1754
Laid down: 22 June 1754 
Launched: 13 December 1757 
Fate: Broken up, 1775 

Builder: Plymouth Dockyard 
Ordered: 13 May 1758
Laid down: 9 August 1758
Launched: 31 May 1766 
Fate: Broken up, 1783

References
 Lavery, Brian (2003) The Ship of the Line – Volume 1: The development of the battlefleet 1650–1850. Conway Maritime Press. . 
 Lyon, David (1993) The Sailing Navy List. Conway Maritime Press.  
 Winfield, Rif (2007) British Warships in the Age of Sail: 1714 – 1792. Seaforth Publishing.  

 

Ship of the line classes
Ship classes of the Royal Navy